Tour EDF is an office skyscraper located in La Défense, the high-rise business district west of Paris, France.

The tower was built for Électricité de France (EDF), France's main electricity company, and hosts the company's offices. Tour EDF is 165 m (541 ft) tall. The skyscraper's ground shape is elliptical, with a maximum length of 70 m (230 ft) and a maximum width of 32 m (105 ft).

Description
Tour EDF's most striking characteristic consists in the extrusion of a conic section of the tower on its northern edge. The resulting conic hole extends from the ground floor to the 26th floor and serves as the main entrance to the tower, an entrance built under a wide circular canopy 24 m (79 ft) in diameter. As a consequence, the length of the tower is slightly less at its base than at its top.

The cladding of the tower alternates horizontal stripes of plain steel and tinted windows.

See also 
 71 South Wacker - a similar building designed by the same firm in Chicago, formerly known as the Hyatt Center
 List of tallest structures in Paris

External links 
 Tour EDF (Emporis)
 Tour EDF (Insecula)

EDF
EDF
Buildings and structures completed in 2001
Électricité de France
21st-century architecture in France